This page details the career achievements of American basketball player Dwight Howard.

Awards
 Olympic gold medal: 2008
 NBA champion: 2020
 Eastern Conference Champion: 2009
 3x Southeast Division Champion: 2008, 2009, 2010
 3x NBA Defensive Player of the Year: 2009, 2010, 2011
 8 NBA All-Star Selections: 2007–2014
Voted as starter 6 times
 8 All-NBA Selections
First Team: 2008-2012
Second Team: 2014
Third Team: 2007, 2013
 5 NBA All-Defensive Selections
First Team: 2009-2012
Second Team: 2008
 NBA All-Rookie First Team: 2005
 18x Conference Player of the Week
 6x Conference Player of the Month
 NBA Slam Dunk Contest Winner: 2008
Runner-up: 2009
 NBA Community Assist Award: July 2007, January 2009, October 2010
 Parade All-American: 2004

NBA career statistics

Regular season

Averages

Totals

Playoffs

Top career rebounding averages since 1973

Career performances

NBA records and milestones

Regular season
Youngest player in NBA history to:

First player directly out of high school to start in all 82 games of his rookie season
Only player to record at least 45 points, 19 rebounds and 8 blocks in a game
Since blocks became an official statistic in 
107-102 overtime win, Orlando Magic vs. Charlotte Bobcats, February 17, 2009

One of two players to record at least 30 points and 15 rebounds while shooting perfectly from the field in a game
Including Wilt Chamberlain, who recorded 34 points on 14-14 shooting from the field, 27 rebounds (and 11 blocks, not officially counted) in 40 minutes, Los Angeles Lakers vs. Detroit Pistons, on 
Howard scored 30 points on 11-11 shooting from the field and grabbed 16 rebounds in 34 minutes in a 110-92 win, Orlando Magic at Houston Rockets, February 24, 2010

Fifth player in NBA history to lead the league in blocks and rebounding in the same season
Averaged 2.9 blocks and 13.8 rebounds per game.
The other four players are Kareem Abdul-Jabbar, Bill Walton, Hakeem Olajuwon and Ben Wallace.  All of these players have been inducted into the Basketball Hall of Fame.

Only player in NBA history to lead the league in blocks and rebounding in more than one season (-)
Only player in NBA history  to lead the league in blocks, rebounding and field goal percentage in the same season
Averaged 2.8 blocks and 13.2 rebounds per game, and shot 62.1% from the field.

One of two players in NBA history to lead the league in three statistics in the same season

One of two players in NBA history to lead the league in blocks, rebounding and field goal percentage in his career
Kareem Abdul-Jabbar is the only other player to achieve this.

Only player in NBA history to lead the league in rebounding three times before turning 25 years old (-)
One of four players in NBA history to record at least 25 points, 15 rebounds, 5 steals and 5 blocks in a game
Howard scored 25 points, grabbed 16 rebounds and recorded 5 steals and 5 blocks in 34 minutes in a 120-117 win, Los Angeles Lakers at Minnesota Timberwolves, March 27, 2013
The other players to achieve this are Hakeem Olajuwon (four times), David Robinson and Shaquille O'Neal.

Consecutive seasons leading the league in total rebounds: 5 (-)
Howard broke Wilt Chamberlain's record of four (-, -).

Consecutive NBA Defensive Player of the Year awards: 3 (-)
Free throw attempts, game: 39, twice
39, Orlando Magic at Golden State Warriors, January 12, 2012 (made 21)
39, Los Angeles Lakers at Orlando Magic, March 12, 2013 (made 25)
Free throw attempts, none made, NBA debut: 6, Orlando Magic vs. Milwaukee Bucks, November 3, 2004
Seasons leading the league in defensive rebounds: 6 (-)
Consecutive seasons leading the league in defensive rebounds: 6 (-)
One of two players in NBA history to record at least 30 points, 19 rebounds, 10 blocks, and 3 assists in a game
Kareem Abdul-Jabbar achieved this (Los Angeles Lakers vs. Atlanta Hawks, November 2, 1975).
One of eight players in NBA history to record a double-double in nine consecutive season openers

Playoffs
First player to record three 20-point, 20-rebound games in a playoff series since Wilt Chamberlain in 1972 NBA Finals
vs. Toronto Raptors, 2008 Eastern Conference First Round
Highest field goal percentage, career: .601 (419-697)
Highest field goal percentage, any playoff series: .844 (27-32), Orlando Magic vs. Atlanta Hawks, 2010 Eastern Conference Semifinals
Blocked shots, half: 8, first half, Orlando Magic vs. Charlotte Bobcats, April 18, 2010
tied with Derrick Coleman, New Jersey Nets vs. Cleveland Cavaliers, May 7, 1993
Blocked shots, quarter: 6, first quarter, Orlando Magic vs. Charlotte Bobcats, April 18, 2010
Personal fouls, single postseason: 102, 2009
Personal fouls, 4-game series: 22, Orlando Magic vs. Charlotte Bobcats, 2010 Eastern Conference First Round
tied with Al Attles (San Francisco vs. Los Angeles, 1968), Doc Rivers (Atlanta vs. Detroit, 1986), and Zydrunas Ilgauskas (Cleveland vs. Indiana, 1998)
Disqualifications, 4-game series: 2, Orlando Magic vs. Charlotte Bobcats, 2010 Eastern Conference First Round

NBA Finals
Blocked shots, 5-game series: 20, Orlando Magic vs. Los Angeles Lakers, 2009
Blocked shots, game: 9, Orlando Magic vs. Los Angeles Lakers, June 11, 2009 (OT)

All-Star
Personal fouls, quarter: 4, fourth quarter, 2010

Ranks 2nd in NBA history

Regular season
Free throw attempts, half: 22, second half, Houston Rockets vs. San Antonio Spurs, January 28, 2014
Free throw attempts, quarter: 17, second quarter, Los Angeles Lakers at Orlando Magic, March 12, 2013
Seasons leading the league in total rebounds: 6 (-)
Trailing Wilt Chamberlain's record of 11.
Highest average, defensive rebounds per game, career: 9.3 (6,500/697)
Trailing Dave Cowens (9.8)
Consecutive seasons leading the league in blocked shots: 2 (-)
NBA Defensive Player of the Year awards: 3 (-)
Trailing Ben Wallace (4) and Dikembe Mutombo (4)

Playoffs
Highest field goal percentage, 6-game series: .683 (41-60), Orlando Magic vs. Philadelphia 76ers, 2009 Eastern Conference First Round
Offensive rebounds, 5-game series: 35, Orlando Magic vs. Toronto Raptors, 2008 Eastern Conference First Round
Highest average, defensive rebounds per game, career: 10.0 (611/61)
Defensive rebounds, single postseason: 254, 2009
Defensive rebounds, 7-game series: 91, Orlando Magic vs. Boston Celtics, 2009 Eastern Conference Semifinals
Blocked shots, 4-game series: 20, Orlando Magic vs. Charlotte Bobcats, 2010 Eastern Conference First Round
Blocked shots, game: 9, twice
9, Orlando Magic vs. Los Angeles Lakers, June 11, 2009 (OT)
9, Orlando Magic vs. Charlotte Bobcats, April 18, 2010
Turnovers, 6-game series: 33, Orlando Magic vs. Atlanta Hawks, 2011 Eastern Conference First Round

Finals
Defensive rebounds, 5-game series: 58, Orlando Magic vs. Los Angeles Lakers, 2009

Ranks 3rd in NBA history

Regular season
Free throw attempts, half: 21, second half, Orlando Magic at Golden State Warriors, January 12, 2012
Free throw attempts, quarter: 16, four times
16, third quarter, Orlando Magic vs. Charlotte Bobcats, November 23, 2007
16, fourth quarter, Orlando Magic vs. Cleveland Cavaliers, February 3, 2012
16, fourth quarter, Houston Rockets vs. Los Angeles Lakers, January 8, 2014
16, third quarter, Houston Rockets vs. San Antonio Spurs, January 28, 2014
3rd youngest player in NBA history to reach 10,000 career rebounds: Houston Rockets vs. Denver Nuggets, December 13, 2014
Only Wilt Chamberlain (28 years, 81 days) and Bill Russell (28 years, 285 days) reached the milestone at a younger age.

Playoffs
Highest average, offensive rebounds per game, career: 4.1 (250/61)

Ranks 4th in NBA history

Regular season
Free throws made, game: 25, Los Angeles Lakers at Orlando Magic, March 12, 2013
Free throw attempts, half: 20, thrice
20, second half, Orlando Magic vs. Milwaukee Bucks, November 24, 2008
20, second half, Los Angeles Lakers at Orlando Magic, March 12, 2013
20, second half, Houston Rockets vs. Los Angeles Lakers, January 8, 2014
Seasons leading the league in rebounding: 5 (-, -)
Consecutive seasons leading the league in rebounding: 3 (-)

Playoffs
Points, overtime: 10, Orlando Magic vs. Cleveland Cavaliers, May 26, 2009
Highest average, blocked shots per game, career: 2.73 (183/67)

NBA highs since 1983-84
Most games with 13 or more rebounds: 524
Most games with 12 or more rebounds: 613
Most games with at least 23 rebounds and 3 blocked shots: 10
Most games with at least 20 rebounds and 3 blocked shots: 38
Most games with at least 24 rebounds and 2 blocked shots: 10
Most games with at least 23 rebounds and 2 blocked shots: 18
Most games with at least 22 rebounds and 2 blocked shots: 25
Most games with at least 21 rebounds and 2 blocked shots: 35
Most games with at least 20 rebounds and 2 blocked shots: 58
Most games with at least 19 rebounds and 2 blocked shots: 68
Most games with at least 18 rebounds and 1 blocked shot: 124
Most games with at least 17 rebounds and 1 blocked shot: 158
Most games with at least 16 rebounds and 1 blocked shot: 231
Most games with at least 15 rebounds and 1 blocked shot: 311
Most games with at least 14 rebounds and 1 blocked shot: 388
Most games with at least 13 rebounds and 1 blocked shot: 467
Most games with at least 21 rebounds, 1 blocked shot and 1 steal: 34
Most games with at least 20 rebounds, 1 blocked shot and 1 steal: 53
Most games with at least 19 rebounds, 1 blocked shot and 1 steal: 62
Most games with at least 18 rebounds, 1 blocked shot and 1 steal: 82
Most games with at least 24 rebounds, 2 blocked shots and 1 steal: 9
Most games with at least 23 rebounds, 2 blocked shots and 1 steal: 13
Most games with at least 22 rebounds, 2 blocked shots and 1 steal: 19
Most games with at least 21 rebounds, 2 blocked shots and 1 steal: 27
Most games with at least 20 rebounds, 2 blocked shots and 1 steal: 43
Most games with at least 24 rebounds, 3 blocked shots and 1 steal: 6
Most games with at least 22 rebounds, 3 blocked shots and 1 steal: 11
Most games with at least 12 defensive rebounds: 244
Most games with at least 11 defensive rebounds: 341
Most games with at least 10 defensive rebounds: 467
Most games with at least 17 defensive rebounds and 1 blocked shot: 28
Most games with at least 16 defensive rebounds and 1 blocked shot: 43
Most games with at least 15 defensive rebounds and 1 blocked shot: 70
Most games with at least 14 defensive rebounds and 1 blocked shot: 111
Most games with at least 13 defensive rebounds and 1 blocked shot: 154
Most games with at least 12 defensive rebounds and 1 blocked shot: 221
Most games with at least 11 defensive rebounds and 1 blocked shot: 308
Most games with at least 10 defensive rebounds and 1 blocked shot: 422
Most games with at least 21 defensive rebounds and 2 blocked shots: 2
Most games with at least 20 defensive rebounds and 2 blocked shots: 4
Most games with at least 18 defensive rebounds and 2 blocked shots: 14
Most games with at least 17 defensive rebounds and 2 blocked shots: 24
Most games with at least 16 defensive rebounds and 2 blocked shots: 34
Most games with at least 15 defensive rebounds and 2 blocked shots: 53
Most games with at least 14 defensive rebounds and 2 blocked shots: 82
Most games with at least 13 defensive rebounds and 2 blocked shots: 111
Most games with at least 12 defensive rebounds and 2 blocked shots: 157

Orlando Magic franchise records

Regular season

Service
Consecutive games played: 351,  to 

Consecutive games started: 201,  to 

Seasons, playing in every team game: Five (-)

Seasons, starting in every team game: Four (-)

Minutes played, career: 22,471

Scoring
Points, career: 11,435

Seasons scoring 1,000 or more points: Seven (-)

Field goal percentage
Highest field goal percentage, season: .612 (510-834)

Most field goals without a miss, game: 11-11, at Houston Rockets, 

Most field goals without a miss, half: 10-10, twice
10-10, second half, vs. Utah Jazz, 
10-10, first half, at Philadelphia 76ers,

Free throws
Free throws made, career: 3,366

Free throws made, game: 21, at Golden State Warriors, 

Free throws made, half: 15, second half, at Oklahoma City Thunder, 

Free throw attempts, career: 5,727

Free throw attempts, season: 916

Free throw attempts, game: 39, at Golden State Warriors, 

Free throw attempts, half: 21, second half, at Golden State Warriors, 

Free throw attempts, quarter: 16, twice
16, third quarter, vs. Charlotte Bobcats, 
16, fourth quarter, vs. Cleveland Cavaliers, 

Free throws missed, game: 18, at Golden State Warriors, January 12, 2012 (21-39)

Free throws attempts, none made, game: 6, vs. Milwaukee Bucks, November 3, 2004
Tied with Monty Williams (at Houston Rockets, February 26, 2002), Drew Gooden (vs. Denver Nuggets, February 20, 2004), DeShawn Stevenson (vs. Chicago Bulls, April 6, 2005), and Maurice Harkless (at Detroit PIstons, January 28, 2014)

Rebounding
Rebounds, career: 8,072

Highest average, rebounds per game, career: 13.0 (8,072/621)

Seasons with 1,000 or more rebounds: Six (-)

Rebounds, season: 1,161

Rebounding average, season: 14.5 (785/54)

Rebounds, quarter: 12, twice
12, first quarter, vs. Detroit Pistons, 
12, third quarter, vs. Charlotte Bobcats, 

Rebounds without an offensive rebound, game: 15, vs. New Orleans Hornets, April 1, 2008

Rebounds, one offensive rebound, game: 19, twice
19, at Chicago Bulls, November 29, 2005
19, vs. Atlanta Hawks, January 30, 2010
broken by Tobias Harris (20), vs. L.A. Lakers, January 24, 2014

Rebounds, two offensive rebounds, game: 22, at Los Angeles Clippers, December 8, 2008

Games with 20 or more rebounds, career: 58

Games with 20 or more rebounds, season: 11

Games with 10 or more rebounds, season: 72

Consecutive games with 20 or more rebounds: 3, twice
3,  to 
3,  to 

Consecutive games with 15 or more rebounds: 7,  to 

Consecutive games with 13 or more rebounds: 14,  to 

Consecutive games with 10 or more rebounds: 33,  to 

Offensive rebounds, career: 2,266

Offensive rebounds, quarter: 7, first quarter, vs. Detroit Pistons, 
tied by Rashard Lewis (first quarter, vs. Boston Celtics)

Offensive rebounds, overtime: 4, at New Orleans Hornets, 
tied with Terry Catledge (vs. Washington Bullets)

Consecutive games with an offensive rebound: 121, January 27, 2009 – October 28, 2010

Games with an offensive rebound, season: 82, 2009–10

Defensive rebounds, career: 5,806

Defensive rebounds, season: 882

Defensive rebounds, game: 21, vs. Miami Heat,  (OT)

Defensive rebounds, half: 13, twice
13, second half, at Los Angeles Clippers, 
13, second half, vs. Atlanta Hawks, 
13, second half, vs. Miami Heat, 

Defensive rebounds, quarter: 10, twice
10, third quarter, vs. Charlotte Bobcats, 
10, fourth quarter, vs. Miami Heat, 

Defensive rebounds, overtime: 5, vs. Minnesota Timberwolves,

Steals
Steals, quarter: 4, first quarter, at Los Angeles Clippers, 
tied with Pat Garrity (first quarter, vs. Cleveland Cavaliers), Doug Christie (third quarter, vs. Los Angeles Clippers) and others

Blocked shots
Blocked shots, career: 1,344

Blocked shots, quarter: 6, third quarter, vs. Minnesota Timberwolves, 

Blocked shots, one or fewer personal fouls, game: 8, vs. Cleveland Cavaliers, February 3, 2012

Consecutive games with a blocked shot: 44,  to

Turnovers
Turnovers, career: 1,930

Turnovers, season: 317
tied with Steve Francis

Turnovers, game: 11, at Chicago Bulls, 

Turnovers, half: 7, first half, vs. Toronto Raptors, 
tied with Terry Catledge (second half, vs. Boston Celtics)

Turnovers, quarter: 5, twice
5, third quarter, at Cleveland Cavaliers, 
5, third quarter, at New York Knicks, 
tied with Troy Hudson (fourth quarter, vs. Miami Heat)

Personal fouls
Personal fouls, career: 2,002

Personal fouls, half: 6, second half, vs. Detroit Pistons, 
Tied with many players

Disqualifications, career: 25

Double-doubles
Double-doubles, career: 457

Double-doubles, season: 69

Consecutive games with a double-double: 33,  to

Playoffs

Scoring
Points, game: 46, vs. Atlanta Hawks, 
tied with Tracy McGrady (at Detroit Pistons)

Points, half: 31, first half, vs. Atlanta Hawks, 

Points, quarter: 20, second quarter, vs. Atlanta Hawks, 
tied with Jameer Nelson (third quarter, vs. Atlanta Hawks)

Points, overtime: 10, vs. Cleveland Cavaliers,

Field goals
Field goals, overtime: 4, vs. Cleveland Cavaliers,

Free throws
Free throws made, game: 15, vs. Atlanta Hawks, 

Free throws made, half: 12, second half, vs. Cleveland Cavaliers, 

Free throws made, quarter: 10, second quarter, vs. Atlanta Hawks, 

Free throw attempts, game: 22, vs. Atlanta Hawks, 

Free throw attempts, half: 15, second half, vs. Cleveland Cavaliers, 

Free throw attempts, quarter: 13, second quarter, vs. Atlanta Hawks,

Rebounding
Rebounds, game: 24, vs. Philadelphia 76ers, 

Rebounds, quarter: 11, first quarter, vs. Los Angeles Lakers, 

Rebounds, overtime: 5, at Boston Celtics, 

Defensive rebounds, game: 18, at Boston Celtics, 

Defensive rebounds, half: 10, second half, at Boston Celtics, 

Defensive rebounds, quarter: 8, first quarter, vs. Los Angeles Lakers,

Steals
Steals, overtime: 1, vs. Cleveland Cavaliers, 
tied with Dee Brown (vs. Milwaukee Bucks) and Rafer Alston (vs. Cleveland Cavaliers)

Blocked shots
Blocked shots, game: 9, twice
9, vs. Los Angeles Lakers,  (OT)
9, vs. Charlotte Bobcats, 

Blocked shots, half: 8, first half, vs. Charlotte Bobcats, 

Blocked shots, quarter: 6, first quarter, vs. Charlotte Bobcats,

Rookie

Most field goals without a miss, game: 5-5, vs. Denver Nuggets, 

Most games played: 82
tied with Dennis Scott, Penny Hardaway, Chucky Atkins, and Mike Miller

Most starts: 82
tied with Penny Hardaway

Los Angeles Lakers franchise records

Regular season
Free throws made, game: 25, at Orlando Magic, 

Free throw attempts, game: 39, at Orlando Magic, 

Free throw attempts, half: 20, second half, at Orlando Magic, 
tied with Shaquille O'Neal (second half, at Golden State Warriors)

Free throw attempts, quarter: 17, second quarter, at Orlando Magic,

Houston Rockets franchise records

Regular season
Free throws missed, game: 15, at Cleveland Cavaliers, March 29, 2016 (7-22)

Playoffs
Free throw attempts, game: 21, vs. L.A. Clippers, May 6, 2015

Rebounds, game: 26, at Dallas Mavericks, April 24, 2015
tied with Moses Malone (vs. Washington Bullets, April 21, 1977) and Hakeem Olajuwon (at Dallas Mavericks, April 30, 1988)
This is an NBA playoff high since at least 1981, and possibly since the aforementioned game by Moses Malone.

Franchise records set as an opponent
Note: Different franchises track different records.  For instance, some track records for halves and quarters of games, and some do not.  Some track single-season and individual playoff series records, and some do not.  Therefore, there is no consistency among franchises.

 Atlanta Hawks
Defensive rebounds, game, playoffs: 14, twice
14, Orlando Magic vs. Atlanta Hawks, 
14, Orlando Magic at Atlanta Hawks, 
 Boston Celtics
Defensive rebounds, game, playoffs (regulation): 18, Orlando Magic at Boston Celtics, 
 Charlotte Bobcats
Free throw attempts, quarter: 16, third quarter, Orlando Magic vs. Charlotte Bobcats, 
Rebounds, game: 26, Houston Rockets vs. Charlotte Bobcats, October 30, 2013
Rebounds, half: 17, first half, Houston Rockets vs. Charlotte Bobcats, October 30, 2013
Rebounds, quarter: 12, third quarter, Orlando Magic vs. Charlotte Bobcats, 
Defensive rebounds, game: 20, Houston Rockets vs. Charlotte Bobcats, October 30, 2013
Defensive rebounds, half: 12, first half, Houston Rockets vs. Charlotte Bobcats, October 30, 2013
tied with Chris Kaman on December 23, 2005
Defensive rebounds, quarter: 10, third quarter, Orlando Magic vs. Charlotte Bobcats, 
Blocked shots, game: 8, Orlando Magic vs. Charlotte Bobcats,  (OT)
Free throw attempts, game, playoffs: 12, Orlando Magic vs. Charlotte Bobcats, 
Rebounds, game, playoffs: 13, Orlando Magic at Charlotte Bobcats, 
Offensive rebounds, game, playoffs: 7, Orlando Magic vs. Charlotte Bobcats, 
Defensive rebounds, game, playoffs: 12, Orlando Magic at Charlotte Bobcats, 
Blocked shots, game, playoffs: 9, Orlando Magic vs. Charlotte Bobcats, 
Turnovers, game, playoffs: 6, Orlando Magic vs. Charlotte Bobcats, 
 Dallas Mavericks
Rebounds, game, playoffs: 26, Houston Rockets at Dallas Mavericks, April 24, 2015
tied with Hakeem Olajuwon on April 30, 1988
Offensive rebounds, game, playoffs: 11, Houston Rockets at Dallas Mavericks, April 24, 2015
 Golden State Warriors
Free throw attempts, game: 39, Orlando Magic at Golden State Warriors, 
Free throw attempts, half: 21, second half, Orlando Magic at Golden State Warriors, 
Offensive rebounds, game, playoffs: 11, Houston Rockets at Golden State Warriors, April 27, 2016
tied with Karl Malone (Utah Jazz vs. Golden State Warriors, April 29, 1989)
 Houston Rockets
Most field goals without a miss, game: 11, Orlando Magic at Houston Rockets, 
 Memphis Grizzlies
Rebounds, game: 23, Orlando Magic at Memphis Grizzlies, 
tied with Patrick Ewing, Elton Brand and Tyson Chandler
 Miami Heat
Defensive rebounds, quarter: 10, fourth quarter, Orlando Magic vs. Miami Heat, March 13, 2012
tied with Patrick Ewing on December 19, 1992, Tim Duncan on February 1, 2003 and Marcus Camby on December 2, 2007
 Oklahoma City Thunder
Free throws made, half: 15, second half, Orlando Magic at Oklahoma City Thunder, 
Blocked shots, half: 7, first half, Orlando Magic at Oklahoma City Thunder, 
 Orlando Magic
Free throws made, game: 25, Los Angeles Lakers at Orlando Magic, 
Free throw attempts, game: 39, Los Angeles Lakers at Orlando Magic, 
Free throw attempts, half: 20, second half, Los Angeles Lakers at Orlando Magic, 
tied with Allen Iverson on 
Free throw attempts, quarter: 17, second quarter, Los Angeles Lakers at Orlando Magic, 
San Antonio Spurs
Free throws made, quarter: 10, third quarter, Houston Rockets vs. San Antonio Spurs, January 28, 2014
tied with Jay Vincent on March 19, 1985 and Dirk Nowitzki on February 28, 2008
Free throw attempts, game: 25, Houston Rockets vs. San Antonio Spurs, January 28, 2014
Free throw attempts, half: 22, second half, Houston Rockets vs. San Antonio Spurs, January 28, 2014
Free throw attempts, quarter: 16, third quarter, Houston Rockets vs. San Antonio Spurs, January 28, 2014
 Toronto Raptors
Offensive rebounds, half: 8, second half, Orlando Magic at Toronto Raptors, 
tied with Dale Davis and others
Turnovers, half: 7, first half, Orlando Magic vs. Toronto Raptors, 
tied with Antoine Walker on 
Highest field goal percentage, game, playoffs: .750 (9-12), Orlando Magic at Toronto Raptors, 
Rebounds, game, playoffs: 22, Orlando Magic vs. Toronto Raptors, 
Offensive rebounds, game, playoffs: 10, Orlando Magic vs. Toronto Raptors, 
Defensive rebounds, game, playoffs: 15, Orlando Magic vs. Toronto Raptors, 
Blocked shots, game, playoffs: 8, Orlando Magic at Toronto Raptors,

See also
List of National Basketball Association career rebounding leaders
List of National Basketball Association career blocks leaders
List of National Basketball Association career playoff blocks leaders
List of National Basketball Association season rebounding leaders
List of National Basketball Association season blocks leaders
List of National Basketball Association players with most blocks in a game

References

Howard, Dwight